Alberto Górriz Echarte (born 16 February 1958) is a Spanish former professional footballer who played mainly as a central defender.

His main asset was his heading ability, and he often scored from set pieces. He spent his entire career with Real Sociedad, appearing in nearly 600 official matches and winning four major titles.

Górriz represented Spain at the 1990 World Cup.

Club career
A Real Sociedad youth graduate, Górriz was born in Irun, Gipuzkoa, and played solely for the Basques, making his first-team debut on 8 April 1979 in a 4–0 away win against Rayo Vallecano. From his third season – where Real won the La Liga title – onwards he was a defensive stalwart until the 1991–92 campaign, with 31 games as his minimum output, often being partnered by Agustín Gajate who also only played for one professional club.

Górriz retired in June 1993 having appeared in 461 top-flight matches (599 overall, the club record), his final year also being the old Atotxa Stadium's last.

International career
Górriz earned 12 caps with the Spain national team, in slightly less than two years. He made his debut on 16 November 1988 at already 30, in a decisive 1990 FIFA World Cup qualifier against the Republic of Ireland, a 2–0 triumph in Seville.

Being subsequently picked for the final stages in Italy, Górriz scored his only goal for his country, in the 2–1 group stage win over Belgium, heading home a free kick from Real Madrid's Míchel.

Honours
Real Sociedad
La Liga: 1980–81, 1981–82
Copa del Rey: 1986–87
Supercopa de España: 1982

See also
List of La Liga players (400+ appearances)
List of one-club men in association football

References

External links

1958 births
Living people
Sportspeople from Irun
Spanish footballers
Footballers from the Basque Country (autonomous community)
Association football defenders
La Liga players
Tercera División players
Real Sociedad B footballers
Real Sociedad footballers
Spain international footballers
1990 FIFA World Cup players
Basque Country international footballers